Clarke County is a county in the Commonwealth of Virginia. As of the 2020 census, the population was 14,783. Its county seat is Berryville.  Clarke County is included in the Washington-Arlington-Alexandria, DC-VA-MD-WV Metropolitan Statistical Area.

History
The first settlement of the Virginia Colony in the future Clarke County was in 1736 by Thomas Fairfax, 6th Lord Fairfax of Cameron who built a home, Greenway Court, on part of his  property, near what is now the village of White Post. White Post was named for the large signpost pointing the way to Lord Fairfax's home.

As it lay just west of the Blue Ridge border demarcated under Governor Spotswood at Albany in 1722, the area was claimed along with the rest of the Shenandoah Valley by the Six Nations Iroquois (who had overrun it during the later Beaver Wars in around 1672), until the Treaty of Lancaster in 1744, when it was purchased from them by Governor Gooch.

Many of the early settlers of what became Clarke County were children of Tidewater planters, who settled on large land grants from Lord Fairfax.  Two thirds of the county was settled by the plantation group, and the plantation lifestyle thrived until the Civil War. County status came in 1836, when it was divided off from Frederick County. Clarke County was known for its large crops of wheat.

During the American Civil War, John S. Mosby, "the Gray Ghost" of the Confederacy, raided General Philip Sheridan's supply train in the summer of 1864, in Berryville. The Battle of Cool Spring was fought in Clarke County on July 17 and 18, 1864, followed by the Battle of Berryville on September 3, 1864.

In 1881 was founded the Bank of Clarke County, a still-functional regional bank with headquarters in Berryville.

Early in the 20th century, the future Virginia politician Harry F. Byrd Sr. and his wife established their first home near Berryville, where he undertook extensive agricultural activity growing peaches and apples. Byrd became a state senator in the upper house of the Virginia General Assembly, served a term as a Governor of Virginia, and was a United States senator for over 30 years. He headed the powerful Byrd Organization, which dominated state politics between the mid-1920s and the 1960s.

In 1996, Forrest Pritchard revitalized Smithfield Farm by starting a grass-fed, sustainable livestock operation. Renamed 'Smith Meadows', it is currently one of the oldest fully grass-finished farms in the United States, and its story was chronicled in the New York Times bestseller Gaining Ground.

Historic buildings and structures

Clermont Estate (1751)
 Dearmont Hall (1850)
Fairfield (1765)
Soldier's Rest (1769)
Buck Marsh Church (1772)
Norwood (1780)
Burwell-Morgan Mill (1782)
Holy Cross Abbey (1784)
Audley Estate (1794)
Bel Voi (1803)
Long Branch Plantation (1811)
Rosemont Estate (1811)
Clay Hill (1816)
Smithfield Farm (1816)
Clifton (1833)
Clarke County Courthouse (1837)
Stone's Chapel (1848)
Glendale Farm (1850)
Site of Mosby's Raid (1863)

Geography

It is the third-smallest county in Virginia by total area.

Adjacent counties
 Loudoun County, Virginia – East
 Warren County, Virginia – Southwest
 Fauquier County, Virginia – Southeast
 Frederick County, Virginia – West
 Jefferson County, West Virginia – North

Government

Board of Supervisors
Berryville District: Matthew E. Bass (I)
Buckmarsh District: David S. Weiss (R)
Millwood District: Terri Catlett (R)
Russell District: Douglas M. Lawrence (I)
White Post District: Bev B. McKay (R)

Constitutional officers
Clerk of the Circuit Court: April F. Wilkerson (R)
Commissioner of the Revenue: Donna Mathews Peake (R)
Commonwealth's Attorney: Anne M. Williams (R)
Sheriff: Anthony W. Roper (D)
Treasurer: Sharon E. Keeler (D)

Clarke County is represented by Republican Jill Holtzman Vogel in the Virginia Senate, Republican Dave LaRock and Democrat Wendy Gooditis in the Virginia House of Delegates, and Democrat Jennifer Wexton in the U.S. House of Representatives.

Demographics

2020 census

Note: the US Census treats Hispanic/Latino as an ethnic category. This table excludes Latinos from the racial categories and assigns them to a separate category. Hispanics/Latinos can be of any race.

2000 Census
As of the census of 2000, there were 12,652 people, 4,942 households, and 3,513 families residing in the county. There were 5,388 housing units at an average density of 30 per square mile (12/km2). The racial makeup of the county was 91.15% White, 6.73% Black or African American, 0.19% Native American, 0.49% Asian, 0.03% Pacific Islander, 0.55% from other races, and 0.85% from two or more races. 1.46% of the population was Hispanic or Latino of any race.

By 2005 90.1% of Clarke County's population was non-Hispanic whites. 6.3% were African-American. 0.2% Native American. 0.6% Asian. 2.6% were Latino.

There were 4,942 households, out of which 29.40% had children under the age of 18 living with them, 58.20% were married couples living together, 8.90% had a female householder with no husband present, and 28.90% were non-families. 24.10% of all households were made up of individuals, and 9.90% had someone living alone who was 65 years of age or older. The average household size was 2.50 and the average family size was 2.97.

In the county, the population was spread out, with 23.40% under the age of 18, 5.80% from 18 to 24, 29.10% from 25 to 44, 27.10% from 45 to 64, and 14.60% who were 65 years of age or older. The median age was 41 years. For every 100 females, there were 98.00 males. For every 100 females age 18 and over, there were 96.60 males.

The median income for a household in the county was $51,601, and the median income for a family was $59,750. Males had a median income of $40,254 versus $30,165 for females. The per capita income for the county was $24,844. About 4.20% of families and 6.60% of the population were below the poverty line, including 7.10% of those under age 18 and 11.10% of those age 65 or over.

Transportation

Major highways
 
 
 
 
 

The Norfolk Southern Railway's H-Line runs the perimeter of Clarke County.

Service 
 Handley Regional Library System

Communities

Towns
Berryville
Boyce

Census-designated place
Shenandoah Retreat

Other unincorporated communities

Berrys
Bethel
Briggs
Care Free Acres
Castlemans Ferry
Claytonville
Double Tollgate
Frogtown
Gaylord
Greenway Court
Lewisville
Lockes Landing
Millwood
Pigeon Hill
Pine Grove
Pyletown
Saratoga
Stone Bridge
Stringtown
Swimley
Wadesville
Waterloo
Webbtown
White Post
Wickliffe

Gallery

See also
National Register of Historic Places listings in Clarke County, Virginia

References

External links

Clarke County Official Government Website
Clarke County Public Schools
Clarke County Historical Association
VAGenWeb Clarke County
Clarke County Fair

 
Virginia counties
Northern Virginia counties
Washington metropolitan area
1836 establishments in Virginia
Populated places established in 1836